Artur Razmikovich Grigorian (born 20 October 1967) is a retired Armenian-Uzbek professional boxer.

Grigorian is a former WBO lightweight champion. He defended his title against record-breaking 17 boxers, and held it for seven years, six months and twenty days; nearly as long as record holder Benny Leonard held his lightweight title (7 years, 8 months).

Biography
Grigorian was born on 20 October 1967 in Soviet Tashkent, Uzbek SSR to an Armenian family from Nagorno-Karabakh. He has a brother and sister.

Amateur career
Grigorian began boxing at the age of 11. He defeated Shane Mosley and won a gold medal at the 1990 Goodwill Games in Seattle City. Grigorian won a silver medal at the 1991 World Amateur Boxing Championships and competed at the 1992 Summer Olympics in Barcelona.

1991 2nd place as a lightweight at the World Championships in Sydney, Australia. His results were:
Defeated Juan Carlos Saiz (Spain) PTS (26–18)
Defeated Julio Gonzalez (Cuba) PTS (15–12)
Defeated Hong Sung-Sik (South Korea) PTS (19–7)
Defeated Justin Rowsell (Australia) PTS (21–15)
Lost to Marco Rudolph (Germany) PTS (14–19)
1992 Grigorian represented the Unified Team (Former Soviet Union) at the Barcelona Olympic Games as a lightweight. His results were:
Defeated Óscar Palomino (Spain) 11–10
Lost to Hong Sung-Sik (South Korea) 3–9

Artur had a final amateur record of 361–23.

Professional career
Trained by Fritz Sdunek, Grigorian began his professional career in 1994 and won eight consecutive bouts. On 23 July 1994, Grigorian defeated Turkish boxer Senturk Ozdemir by a fifth-round technical knockout and won the vacant German International lightweight title.

On 1 April 1995, Grigorian defeated Antonio Strabello and became the WBO Inter-Continental champion. After six non-title bouts and one title defense, Artur, with a perfect 19–0 record, became eligible to fight for the WBO lightweight championship world title. The title had recently been vacated by Oscar De La Hoya after he moved up to the light welterweight division.

Grigorian faced Puerto Rican Antonio Rivera on 13 April 1996, for the vacant WBO lightweight title. Both were the two top contenders in the lightweight division. Artur won by knocking Rivera out in the twelfth round and became the new WBO lightweight champion.

After four title defenses, Grigorian defended his belt against undefeated challenger Marco Rudolph. Rudolph had bested Grigorian seven years earlier at the 1991 World Amateur Boxing Championship finals. Grigorian avenged his amateur defeat by stopping Rudolph in the sixth round.

Grigorian would continue to defend his title a total of seventeen times, a new record in the lightweight division. Artur was just one more defense away from becoming the longest reigning lightweight champion, but ultimately lost his belt to Acelino Freitas by unanimous decision on 3 January 2004. Grigorian had surgery on his right shoulder prior to the bout. Freitas lost the belt in his first title defense against Diego Corrales. Grigorian retired later that year after winning one more bout.

On 24 February 2009, at the age of 41, Artur came out of retirement for one more bout in which he won a six-round unanimous decision against Bulgarian Kirkor Kirkorov. Kirkorov is also of Armenian descent and also a 1991 World Amateur Boxing Championships medalist.

Personal life
Grigorian lives in Germany with his wife and three daughters. He currently works as a boxing trainer.

Professional boxing record

See also
 List of WBO world champions
 List of lightweight boxing champions

References

External links
 

1967 births
Living people
Soviet male boxers
Soviet Armenians
Lightweight boxers
Boxers at the 1992 Summer Olympics
Olympic boxers of the Unified Team
Uzbekistani people of Armenian descent
World lightweight boxing champions
World Boxing Organization champions
Sportspeople from Tashkent
Uzbekistani male boxers
AIBA World Boxing Championships medalists
Goodwill Games medalists in boxing
Competitors at the 1990 Goodwill Games